William Saunders (1787-1861) was an American housewright.  A number of his works are listed on the U.S. National Register of Historic Places.

Works include
Abbot Hall, historic Abbot Academy campus, now part of the Phillips Academy campus, Andover, MA
Walter Frost House, 10 Frost St. Cambridge, MA, NRHP-listed
William Saunders House, 6 Prentiss St. Cambridge, MA, NRHP-listed
Treadwell-Sparks House, 21 Kirkland St. Cambridge, MA, NRHP-listed

References

American construction businesspeople
1767 births
1861 deaths